Bruchköbel is a town in the Main-Kinzig district, in Hesse, Germany. It is situated approximately 6 km north of Hanau. It has a population of c. 20,450.

References

Towns in Hesse
Main-Kinzig-Kreis